El Pony Pisador is a musical group from Barcelona that mixes various styles of folk and traditional music from around the world, including Celtic music, sea songs (sea shanties and habaneras), bluegrass, tarantella and yodel. The band's name refers to the J.R.R. Tolkien's The Lord of the Rings inn The Prancing Pony, called «El Pony Pisador» in the Spanish translation.

Their repertoire includes their own versions and themes. In addition to Catalonia, they have performed in several European countries, the United States and Canada.

Members 
 Ramon Anglada — vocals, guitar, accordion
 Guillem Codern — vocals, banjo, harmonica, Tuvan throat singing 
 Miquel Pérez — vocals, fiddle, percussions
 Martí Selga — vocals, recorder, whistle, bass
 Adrià Vila — vocals, mandolin, bodhrán, spoons, yodeling

Discography 
Studio albums
Yarr's i Trons! (2016)
Matricular una Galera (2019)
JAJA Salu2 (2021)
It's never too late for sea shanties (2021)

See also 
The Longest Johns

References

Musical groups from Catalonia